Yelachenahalli is a Namma Metro station on the Green Line located on Kanakapura Road between Yelechenahalli and Konanakunte suburbs. It was opened to the public on 18 June 2017.

Next to the Yelachenahalli Metro station, stands the electrical switch yard for the metro line. This area was earlier occupied by Shravanthi Kalyana Mantapa. The land was acquired by Namma Metro to build the Yelachenahalli Metro Station. The station also serves the residents of Reserve Bank Layout, Kumaraswamy Layout, ISRO Layout and neighborhoods beyond Konanakunte, like Kaggalipura.

History 
The metro station was initially named Puttenahalli Metro station. The station being closer to Yelachenahalli than Puttenahalli, was renamed to Yelachenahalli metro station in July 2016.

Station layout

Entry/Exits
There are 3 Entry/Exit points – A, B and C. Commuters can use either of the points for their travel.

 Entry/Exit point A: Towards Kanakapura Road side
 Entry/Exit point B: Towards Kanakapura Road side (Konanakunte Cross)
 Entry/Exit point C: Towards Jyothi Kendriya Vidyalaya side

See also

References

External links

 Bangalore Metro Rail Corporation Ltd. (Official site) 
 UrbanRail.Net – descriptions of all metro systems in the world, each with a schematic map showing all stations.

Namma Metro stations
Railway stations in Bangalore